Cyril Taylor may refer to:
Cyril Taylor (doctor) (1921–2000), British doctor and Liverpool politician
Sir Cyril Taylor (educationist) (1935–2018), British educationist and social entrepreneur